WTIF-FM (107.5 FM) is a radio station licensed to Omega, Georgia, United States. The station is currently owned by Danny Sterling, through licensee Sterling Southern Land, LLC.

History
The station received its first callsign, WXJF, on July 12, 1990. On August 30, 1991, the station changed its call sign to WQBX, and on May 10, 1993 to the current WTIF-FM.

WTIF-FM had been airing a Country music format. On July 6, 2022, WTIF-FM ceased operations.

References

External links

TIF-FM
Radio stations established in 1993
1993 establishments in Georgia (U.S. state)